Sabir Bougrine (born 10 July 1996) is a professional footballer who plays as a midfielder for Espérance de Tunis in the Tunisian Ligue Professionnelle 1. Born in Belgium, he represented Morocco at under-23 international level.

Professional career
Bougrine joined the JMG Academy in Lierse in 2009, and moved to Lierse in 2014. Bougrine made his professional debut with Lierse in a 3–1 Belgian First Division A loss to Lommel SK on 25 May 2015. After a couple successful seasons in Lierse where he was one of the better players, Bougrine left the club due to financial difficulties the club had.

On 30 January 2018, Bougrine signed with Paris FC in the French Ligue 2.

On 18 July 2020, Bougrine signed a two-year contract with Azerbaijan Premier League side Neftçi PFK.

On 10 January 2022, Bougrine signed a three-year and half contract with Tunisian Ligue Professionnelle 1 minnows Espérance Sportive de Tunis.

International career
Bougrine debuted for the Belgium national under-19 football team in a 0–0 tie with the Hungary U19s on 6 September 2014. He switched to represent Morocco, and represented the Morocco U23s in a friendly 1–0 win over the Cameroon U23s on 5 June 2016.

References

External links
 
 
 
 
 Mountakhab Profile

1996 births
Living people
Sportspeople from Mechelen
Footballers from Antwerp Province
Moroccan footballers
Morocco youth international footballers
Belgian footballers
Belgium youth international footballers
Belgian sportspeople of Moroccan descent
Paris FC players
Lierse S.K. players
F91 Dudelange players
Neftçi PFK players
Espérance Sportive de Tunis players
Ligue 2 players
Belgian Pro League players
Challenger Pro League players
Azerbaijan Premier League players
Tunisian Ligue Professionnelle 1 players
Association football midfielders
Moroccan expatriate footballers
Belgian expatriate footballers
Expatriate footballers in France
Expatriate footballers in Azerbaijan
Expatriate footballers in Tunisia
Expatriate footballers in Luxembourg
Moroccan expatriate sportspeople in France
Moroccan expatriate sportspeople in Azerbaijan
Moroccan expatriate sportspeople in Tunisia
Moroccan expatriate sportspeople in Luxembourg
Belgian expatriate sportspeople in Azerbaijan
Belgian expatriate sportspeople in Tunisia
Belgian expatriate sportspeople in France
Belgian expatriate sportspeople in Luxembourg